Harmison may refer to two English cricketers of the same family:

 Ben Harmison (born 1986), Durham cricketer
 Steve Harmison (born 1978), Durham and England cricketer

See also
 Harrison (name)